Ralph Eichler (born March 23, 1950) is a politician in Manitoba, Canada.  He is a member of Manitoba legislature for the riding of Lakeside.

Before entering politics, Eichler served for eight years as the administrator of the Interlake School Division.  He also owned and operated Prairie Farm Ranch Supply, an exporter of livestock handling equipment.  In the latter capacity, he oversaw the invention of a device known as "The Stockdoctor", now used internationally.  Eichler has also served as a director on the Prairie Implements Manufacturers Association and the Teulon Golf and Country Club, as well as serving as President of the Interlake Riding Club.

In the Manitoba election of 2003, Eichler was elected to the Manitoba legislature as a Progressive Conservative, defeating New Democrat Robert Marshall by 4102 votes to 3012.  He was only the third person to hold the riding in 81 years. The seat had previously been held by Harry Enns for 34 years, and before that by Douglas Campbell for 47.

The 2003 election was won by the New Democrats, and Eichler sat in opposition until 2016.

He was re-elected in the 2007, 2011, and 2016 provincial elections.

On May 3, 2016, after the new Progressive Conservative government under the leadership of Brian Pallister was sworn in, Eichler was appointed to the Executive Council of Manitoba as Minister of Agriculture.

He was re-elected in the 2019 election.

On October 4, 2022 he announced he will not be seeking re-election in the 2022 election and will serve the rest of his term.

References

External links

1950 births
Living people
Canadian academic administrators
Progressive Conservative Party of Manitoba MLAs
Members of the Executive Council of Manitoba
Canadian people of German descent
21st-century Canadian politicians
Place of birth missing (living people)